Nagerbazar is a locality in  South Dumdum of North 24 Parganas district in the Indian state of West Bengal. It is a part of the area covered by Kolkata Metropolitan Development Authority (KMDA).

History

Clive House is located on Rastraguru Avenue at Ramgarh, Nagerbazar. It is mired in controversy. It is thought of as the first pucca brick and cement building in the Northern fringes of Kolkata, possibly built by the Portuguese. Now, some people are saying that it was the hunting lodge of an Indian prince or noble man (and so where was the jungle?) What is definitely known is that it was used by British soldiers when they first started coming into the country and then Robert Clive took it over, renovated it, added a floor to the single-storeyed building and made it his country house (Some people refer to it as his residence, which appears doubtful) around 1757-60. The house is located on a raised ground. In the otherwise flat surroundings it is even thought of as a mound or a hill. The more interesting part of the story is that "on excavation of Clive House, coins, terracotta figures, sculpture, potteries etc. and information of a Portuguese Fort were found." The articles found could be of the Sen period but some people think that it could have links with the 2,000 years/ more older civilisation unearthed earlier at Chandraketugarh. Clive House is under the Archaeological Survey of India since 2004, but squatters inside and outside Clive House have hindered restoration work.

Geography
It is flanked by Netaji Subhash Chandra Bose International Airport in the north, Dum Dum railway station which is a juncture of both Kolkata Circular Railway as well as the Kolkata suburban railway and Dum Dum metro station in the west, area of Baguiati and adjoining areas of VIP Road in the east and the posh locality of Bangur Avenue and Lake Town in the south.

Connectivity 
In 2012, a flyover was opened from Amarpally to Nagerbazar Sarojini Naidu Women College to decongest the heavy traffic on Jessore Road towards Dumdum/Kolkata Airport.

Kolkata Urban Agglomeration
The following Municipalities, Census Towns and other locations in Barrackpore subdivision were part of Kolkata Urban Agglomeration in the 2011 census: Kanchrapara (M), Jetia (CT), Halisahar (M), Balibhara (CT), Naihati (M), Bhatpara (M), Kaugachhi (CT), Garshyamnagar (CT), Garulia (M), Ichhapur Defence Estate (CT), North Barrackpur (M), Barrackpur Cantonment (CB), Barrackpore (M), Jafarpur (CT), Ruiya (CT), Titagarh (M), Khardaha (M), Bandipur (CT), Panihati (M), Muragachha (CT) New Barrackpore (M), Chandpur (CT), Talbandha (CT), Patulia (CT), Kamarhati (M), Baranagar (M), South Dumdum (M), North Dumdum (M), Dum Dum (M), Noapara (CT), Babanpur (CT), Teghari (CT), Nanna (OG), Chakla (OG), Srotribati (OG) and Panpur (OG).

Gallery

See also 

 Kolkata
 South Dum Dum

References

Cities and towns in North 24 Parganas district
Neighbourhoods in North 24 Parganas district
Neighbourhoods in Kolkata
Kolkata Metropolitan Area